Barbara McNees is the former director of the Greater Pittsburgh Chamber of Commerce until August 15, 2013. She served in this capacity for fifteen years. She was the first female president of the organization. She has a Bachelors of Arts from Geneva College.

She helped to develop the Barbara McNees Spirit of ATHENA Scholarship and the ATHENA Young Professional Award for emerging female leaders.

References

1940s births
Living people
Women in Pennsylvania politics
Place of birth missing (living people)
Geneva College alumni
American women in business
21st-century American women